Chit Khwint Ma Paing is a 1956 Burmese black-and-white drama film, directed by Chit Maung starring Zeya, Kyi Kyi Htay, Khin Maung Myint and Kyaw Pe.

Cast
Zeya as Min Din
Kyi Kyi Htay as Mal Kyi
Khin Maung Myint as Phoe Khin
Kyaw Pe as Pe Tin
Chit Maung as Chit Maung
Myint Pe as Myint Pe

Award

References

1956 films
1950s Burmese-language films
Films shot in Myanmar
Burmese black-and-white films
1956 drama films
Burmese drama films